The Valea de Pești is a right tributary of the river Jiul de Vest in Romania. It flows into the Jiul de Vest near Câmpu lui Neag. The Valea de Pești Dam is built on this river.

References

Rivers of Romania
Rivers of Hunedoara County
Rivers of Gorj County